Penrith is an unincorporated community in Pend Oreille County, in the U.S. state of Washington.

History
A post office called Penrith was established in 1901, and remained in operation until 1916. The community was given its name by railroad officials.

References

Unincorporated communities in Pend Oreille County, Washington
Unincorporated communities in Washington (state)